Steve Bellamy is an entrepreneur in sports and entertainment known for the founding of niche cable television networks, including the Tennis Channel, The Surf Channel, The Skate Channel and The Ski Channel. He is also a writer/director/producer of six feature films, including Winter and The Story. He was also one of the producers of the movie The Game Changers on Netflix. He is the inventor of LiveBall and the founder of The Tennis Channel Open. And he is currently the President of Motion Picture and Entertainment at Kodak.

Biography

Education 
Bellamy attended Indiana University from 1983 to 1986 where he graduated with a business degree. He was the commencement speaker at that school in 2008 and won the university's Distinguished Entrepreneur Award in 2005.

Early Business Career
Bellamy founded Atonal Tennis, Inc. in 1985 which owned and operated the Palisades Tennis Center, Cheviot Hills Tennis, Santa Monica Tennis Center, Westwood Tennis Center and Westchester Tennis Center. While running those tennis centers, Bellamy invented LiveBall which is played in virtually every tennis center around the world.  He also invented the Shotgun 21 tournament format and a number of the tennis rackets sold by Wilson Tennis. While under his purview, the Palisades Tennis Center produced a large portion of the best junior tennis players in the United States.

Sports Channels
About 1997, Bellamy had the idea of cable channel for skiing and started work on the concept. He switched to working on a tennis channel concept given the broader audience for tennis. In 2001, The Tennis Channel (TTC) was founded by Steve Bellamy. The channel was launched in Spring 2003. Bellamy had planned to use the Tennis Channel Open, a Tennis Channel acquisition, as the core event as a part of a larger "Tennispalooza". In 2005, Bellamy left to start The Ski Channel.

In 2006, Bellamy became chief executive officer of Action Sport Networks. In April 2007, Bellamy announced the formation of The Ski Channel that would focus on mountain oriented sports, activity and lifestyle under the aegis of his Atonal Sports and Entertainment.

During the 2012 US Open of Surfing in Huntington Beach, Bellamy announced that he was launching the Surf Channel, devoted to beach, water and board sports, lifestyle and travel, in mid-September.

In 2015, he was made chairman of Action Sport Networks. Bellamy was named Kodak President of Motion Picture and Entertainment in October 2015.

Films
Bellamy has written and directed 6 documentary films usually featuring mountain sports athletes. His film 'The Story' won Best Picture at the Las Vegas Film Festival, where Bellamy also won the award for Best Director. It featured a team making a climb to the top of Mount Everest as well as athletes Bode Miller, Lindsey Vonn and others. The next year, it was followed by Winter.

Atonal Sports and Entertainment
Atonal Sports and Entertainment owned and operated several tennis centers, a film company, Atonal Films and TV, and Palisades Sound Recording Studio. Atonal Films produced documentaries. Sports facilities owned by Atonal included the Palisades Tennis Center, Westwood Tennis Center, Cheviot Hills Tennis Center, Santa Monica Tennis Center and the LA Golf Academy.

LiveBall
In the 1995, Bellamy took over the Palisades Tennis Center. While prepping to move to that facility, he began experimenting for a few years on various games that could push the court density as the Palisades facility only provided his 2 courts to teach on.  While teaching the Schwarzenegger family at their home in the Palisades, he came up with the name LiveBall, and the format of winning 4 out of 5 points before losing 2 after dozens of incarnations.  Bellamy now licenses the game to facilities all over the world.

Music
Bellamy has been a prolific songwriter, having written thousands of songs, and music producer for most of his life. In college he started the band "Johnny Major and the Minors" and then after moving to California fronted the band "Steven Bellamy and the Chronicles". Eventually he performed under the name Steven Bellamy and recorded numerous albums. "Fade To Colourful" and "Happy Apples" were two of them.

Guitar Collection
Bellamy is an avid guitar collector with guitars and amps purportedly previously owned by John Lennon, Jimi Hendrix, Frank Sinatra, Miles Davis, Eddie Van Halen, Leo Fender, Ron Wood, Neil Young, George Benson and others. He has allowed many of them to be used on recordings by famous current artists.

Personal life
Bellamy is known to be out and about in Hollywood often, and is a frequent connector of people. He is an avid hiker and vegan who regularly promotes vegan causes and charities. He is also active on social media. He is married to Beth Herr who is currently on the professional pickleball tour. She was previously #1 in the world in paddle tennis where she and partner Scott Freedman went undefeated for 7 years. And in tennis she won Junior Titles at the French Open, The Championships, Wimbledon and the US Open, the NCAA Singles and Team Championships while at University of Southern California as well as 13 professional tennis titles. They live in Los Angeles and have 4 children.

References

Year of birth missing (living people)
Living people
Tennis mass media
Kelley School of Business alumni
American sports businesspeople
American entertainment industry businesspeople
People from Indiana